The Mesa Arts Center is a performing and visual arts complex in downtown Mesa, Arizona. At more than  square feet, the $95 million facility, completed in 2005, is the largest comprehensive arts campus in the state.

The Mesa Arts Center encompasses four performance venues, from the intimate 99-seat Farnsworth Studio Theater to the 1,600-seat Ikeda Theater. The facility also features 14 visual and performing art classroom studios. Multi-use areas throughout the campus provide both indoor and outdoor gathering and presentation spaces.

Architecture
The architecture of the entire complex is primarily post-modern, with sharp, jagged angles, canted walls, sloping roofs, glass walls, and a reflection of the local vernacular in both colors and materials. The campus is inspired by a geode, and guides pedestrians from the outer concrete walls to a central space of glass, water, and color. This campus has been designed to be reflective of the Sonoran Desert. The complex was designed by Bora Architects of Portland, Oregon in associations with DWL Architects + Planners, Inc., of Phoenix, Arizona. Martha Schwartz Inc. served as landscape architect for the project. Michael Tingley was the Principal Architect from Bora Architects that partnered with Schwartz on the creation of this complex.

The Shadow Walk is a major pathway through the campus that is lined with outdoor gardens, sunken courtyards, performance spaces, water features, stainless steel pergolas, and giant canopies. In addition to the Shadow Walk, public art has been added to the architecture to connect it to the community. This includes "Fragmented Landscapes" by Ned Kahn, "Colorwalk" by Beth Galston, "Light Storm" by Catherine Widgery, and "Memento" by Rebecca Ross.

History
The movement to construct the Mesa Arts Center was championed by Wayne Brown, who served as the Mayor of Mesa from 1996 to 2000.  Under Brown, the city passed a quality-of-life bond issue in 1998 to help pay for the center. Though he left office in 2000, Brown and his wife, Kathye, continued a private fundraising campaign for the arts center. The couple ultimately raised more than $4.5 million from the private sector beginning in 2000. The Mesa Arts Center's sculpture courtyard is named for Wayne Brown.

The Executive Director of the Mesa Arts Center since July, 2010  has been Cindy Ornstein, who is also a faculty associate at ASU's Herberger Institute of Design and the Arts. The Assistant Director since 2006 has been Rob Schultz. Before becoming Assistant Director, Schultz was Visual Arts Supervisor and Acting Arts Administrator. The Performing Arts Administrator is Randall Vogel, CFE. He has been in charge of Theaters and Operations since June 2002.

Programs
The programs are hosted in four buildings on the Mesa Arts Center campus. This includes the four theaters, the Mesa Contemporary Arts Museum, and 14 art studios.
 Performing Live
 Professional touring engagements perform at the Mesa Arts Center; this includes Broadway, classical music, popular music, ethnic artists, western artists, dance, National Geographic Live speaker series, and family entertainment. To view their current list of shows, please visit the Mesa Arts Center website under their "Shows" tab.

References

External links 

 Mesa Arts Center website
 Mesa Arts Center project a Bora Architects website

Arts centers in Arizona
Performing arts centers in Arizona
Art museums and galleries in Arizona
Contemporary art galleries in the United States
Museums in Mesa, Arizona
Music venues in Arizona
Buildings and structures in Mesa, Arizona
Art museums established in 2005
Event venues established in 2005
Buildings and structures completed in 2005
Tourist attractions in Maricopa County, Arizona